This is a list of records from the Australian Football League (AFL) since its founding in 1897. From 1897 to 1989, it was known as the Victorian Football League (VFL).

Team records

Premierships

 * Shortened season due to the Covid 19 pandemic.

Runners up

Minor Premierships

Wooden Spoon

Team wins, losses, win percentage and draws

Highest and lowest scores

All these scores were from the first three years of the VFL competition, when scores, in general, were much lower. The following table shows the lowest scores since 1919 (the first year of complete competition following World War I):

Highest losing scores and lowest winning scores

As with the lowest overall scores, all these were from the first three years of the VFL. The lowest winning scores in more recent times are:

Highest scores for each quarter

Greatest winning margins

Biggest comebacks
Deficit from end of 1/4 time:

Deficit from end of 1/2 time:

Deficit from end of 3/4 time:

Largest comebacks (from any stage of the game):

Highest scores (both teams)

Lowest scores (both teams)

Lowest scores (both teams) since 1919
As with the lowest scores and lowest winning scores, all the lowest aggregate scores above were from the first three years of VFL competition. The lowest match aggregate scores in more recent times are:

Most consecutive wins

Individual records

Disposals

Most Disposals (since 1965)

Note: Only includes performances of 50+ disposals.

Goalkicking

Most career goals

Most goals in a game

Most goals in a season

Most seasons as leading goalkicker

Highest goals per game average

Most goals on debut

Most consecutive games with one or more goals

Most career games for no goals

Games

Most career games

Most consecutive games

Most games for each club

Age records

Youngest players
Age on their debut:

Oldest players
Age in their last game:

Finals

Most premierships

Most Grand Final appearances

Most finals games

Most finals goals

Coaching

Most games coached

Most wins as coach

Most premierships as coach

Player/Coach

Most games played and coached

Awards

Most Brownlow Medals

Most club best and fairests

See also

List of SANFL records
List of Tasmanian Football League records
List of WAFL records

References

External links
 AFL Tables

VFL AFL records
Australian rules football records and statistics
|}